Yuryevetsky District is an administrative and municipal district (raion), one of the twenty-one in Ivanovo Oblast, Russia. It is located in the east of the oblast. Its administrative center is the town of Yuryevets. Population:   19,366 (2002 Census);  The population of Yuryevets accounts for 64.9% of the district's total population.

Administrative and municipal status
The town of Yuryevets serves as the administrative center of the district. Prior to the adoption of the Law #145-OZ On the Administrative-Territorial Division of Ivanovo Oblast in December 2010, it was administratively incorporated separately from the district. Municipally, Yuryevets is incorporated within Yuryevetsky Municipal District as Yuryevetskoye Urban Settlement.

References

Notes

Sources

Districts of Ivanovo Oblast
